Those Glory Glory Days is a 1983 British made-for-television film about football directed by Philip Saville and starring Zoë Nathenson, Sara Sugarman and Cathy Murphy. The screenplay was written by the sports journalist Julie Welch. The film is inspired by Welch's childhood love of football, and helped to establish her as a screenwriter. The film was part of David Puttnam's 'First Love' series broadcast on Channel 4. It was released on 17 November 1983.

Plot summary

The film is about a group of girls growing up in 1960–61 London, who develop an interest in football and support  for Tottenham Hotspur, which became the first English team in the 20th century to achieve the "double", i.e. winning both the English league and the FA Cup in the same season. Twenty years later, one of the girls is trying to make a career as a football journalist and is offered a lift home by her childhood hero Danny Blanchflower. The majority of the film is set during the 1960–1961 season and tells of the girls' obsession with Spurs.

Cast

Zoë Nathenson – Danny Julia  
Sara Sugarman – Toni
Cathy Murphy – Tub
Liz Campion – Jailbird
Amelia Dipple – Petrina
Elizabeth Spriggs – Mistress
Julia McKenzie – Mrs. Herrick
Peter Tilbury – Herrick
Julia Goodman – Journalist Julia
Stephan Chase – Father
Bryan Pringle – Reg
John Salthouse – Young Danny
Danny Blanchflower – Himself
Rachel Meidman – Young Julia
Roddy Maude-Roxby – Brian
Bob Goody – Doorman

Box Office
Goldcrest Films invested £556,000 in the film but earned £313,000, resulting in a loss of £243,000.

References

External links

Those Glory Glory Days at the British Film Institute
Those Glory Glory Days review at Film4.com

1983 television films
1983 films
1980s sports films
British television films
British association football films
Films directed by Philip Saville
Tottenham Hotspur F.C.
Films set in 1960
Films set in 1961
Films set in London
British female buddy films
1980s English-language films
1980s British films